Georg Friedrich Heinrich Hitzig (8 November 1811, in Berlin – 11 October 1881, in Berlin) was a German architect, born into the Jewish Itzig family, converted to Lutheranism. He was a student of  Karl Friedrich Schinkel.

After his diploma in 1835 he founded an architectural practice in Berlin. In 1855 Hitzig became a member of the Prussian Academy of Arts.  In 1868 he became senator and in 1875 president of the academy. in 1880 he was elected department head for building construction of the Academy of Civil Engineering.

For his work he made several educational journeys to Italy, Egypt and Greece (1845/57/64).

Notable buildings
 1848–1891 Neetzow Castle
 1853–1858 Kartlow Castle
 1854–1855 Bredenfelde Castle
 1859? mansion Leipziger Platz 12, Berlin (1859–1878 British Embassy, later Ottoman Embassy)
 1859–1864 Berliner Börse (Berlin Stock Exchange), Burgstraße (destroyed in 1945)
 1865-1867 markethall (later Circus Renz, Circus Schumann, Großes Schauspielhaus, Friedrichsstadtpalast), Am Zirkus 1,  Berlin

 1865-?  Renovation of Remplin Palace
 1868–1871 Palais Kronenberg, Warsaw (Poland)
 1869–1878 Reichsbank (German central bank), Jägerstraße, Berlin (destroyed in 1945)
 1870–1871 Palais Frerich, Berlin-Tiergarten (later part of the Embassy of Switzerland)
 1877–1881 Refurbishing of the Zeughaus in Berlin
 1878–1884 building of the Royal Technical College, (Berlin-) Charlottenburg
 Numerous villas and houses in the Berlin districts of Friedrichstadt and Tiergarten

See also

 Itzig family

1811 births
1881 deaths
19th-century German architects
Recipients of the Pour le Mérite (civil class)